Ioan Popa (born 10 May 1949) is a Romanian equestrian. He competed in the team jumping event at the 1980 Summer Olympics.

References

External links
 

1949 births
Living people
Romanian male equestrians
Olympic equestrians of Romania
Equestrians at the 1980 Summer Olympics
Place of birth missing (living people)